S109 may refer to :
 County Route S109, a county route in Bergen County, New Jersey
 HMS Superb (S109), a 1974 British nuclear-powered fleet submarine of the Swiftsure class